CAEC may refer to:
 Casimiro de Abreu Esporte Clube
 Central Asian Economic Cooperation, an organization later renamed to Organization of Central Asian Cooperation
 Council for Asia-Europe Cooperation
 Catholic Adult Education Centre, based in Sydney, Australia
 One of the County Agricultural Executive Committees, in the United Kingdom